Groslée is a former commune in the Ain department in eastern France. On 1 January 2016, it was merged into the new commune Groslée-Saint-Benoît.

Population

See also
Communes of the Ain department
Lac de Crotel

References

Former communes of Ain
Ain communes articles needing translation from French Wikipedia
Populated places disestablished in 2016